Szczerbak's even-fingered gecko (Alsophylax szczerbaki) is a species of gecko found in Turkmenistan.

References

Alsophylax
Reptiles described in 1979